Bashall Brook is a minor river in Lancashire, England.

The stream rises at Browsholme Tarn on Browsholme Moor descending through Braddup Clough where it collects Elm Clough and flows south and east past Bashall Eaves, meeting Cow Hey Brook before turning northeast to collect Hollins Clough near Back Ridge Farm. It again turns south, passing the Shireburn Caravan Park at Waddington before joining the River Ribble at the Low Moor area of Clitheroe.

References

Rivers of Lancashire
Rivers of Ribble Valley